Nationalist Left – Youth (in Galician: Esquerda Nacionalista - Mocidade) was the youth wing of Nationalist Left (EN), one of the member parties of the Galician Nationalist Bloc (BNG). It organized the young party members. EN-Mocidade was founded in 1984, and worked within the youth wing of BNG, Galiza Nova.

EN-Mocidade published Manesquerda.

In 2008 the organization dissolved itself and formed the Galician Socialist Youth.

References

 Beramendi, X.G. (2007): De provincia a nación. Historia do galeguismo político. Xerais, Vigo

External links 
 Website (Archive)

Youth wings of political parties in Spain
Galician nationalism
Secessionist organizations in Europe
Political parties established in 1984
Political parties disestablished in 2008
Youth organizations established in 1984